The Hundred-Year-Old Man Who Climbed Out the Window and Disappeared, also known as The 100-Year-Old Man Who Climbed Out the Window and Disappeared in the US, is a 2009 comic novel by the Swedish author Jonas Jonasson. The Swedish version was first published on 9 September 2009, and the English version on 12 July 2012.

In 2018, a sequel to the book, The Accidental Further Adventures of the Hundred-Year-Old Man, was published.

Plot
Allan Karlsson is about to celebrate his hundredth birthday, and his retirement home in Malmköping is planning to throw a party. Allan is not interested. Instead, he climbs out the window and disappears. He walks to the bus station, intending to travel as far as his available cash will allow. There he meets a young man with a suitcase too large to take into the toilet with him. The man goes in, rudely demanding that Allan look after the case. But Allan's bus arrives and he decides to board, taking the case with him. It turns out to be full of illegal drug money, and Allan is chased by the drug gang as well as by the police who are treating him as a missing person. He gets caught up in various criminal activities, eventually escaping when the man from the bus station is accidentally trapped in a freezer, his body ending up in a container destined for Djibouti. An elephant crushes another member of the gang, his remains being inadvertently sent to Latvia in the boot of a Ford Mustang.

In parallel with Allan's adventures as a centenarian, the novel includes flashbacks to increasingly fantastic episodes from his younger days.

As a young man, Allan had worked in a dynamite factory, his expertise taking him to Spain during the civil war, where he accidentally saves General Franco. Moving to the United States he becomes good friends with Harry S. Truman, and helps to make the atom bomb.

After the war, Allan is sent to China to help the Kuomintang fight against the communists, but he loses interest and leaves for Sweden by foot, falling in with a group of communists; they cross the Himalayas to Iran, where Allan is taken into custody. As a ruse, Allan offers to help the Chief of Police in an assassination attempt against Winston Churchill.

On returning to Sweden, Allan finds that the authorities doubt his bomb-making expertise, but the Russians do take him seriously and he is befriended by Yury Popov who takes him to the Soviet Union to meet Stalin. However, Stalin is offended by his saving of Franco's life, and Allen finds himself sentenced to hard labour in a gulag in Vladivostok. There he meets Albert Einstein's fictional half brother, Herbert.

Herbert and Allan escape from the gulag, setting fire to the whole of Vladivostok in the process. Travelling to North Korea during the Korean War, the pair pose as Soviet marshal Kirill Afanesievich Meretskov and his aide, and meet Kim Il-sung and Mao Zedong (Mao Tse-tung).  Although they are quickly exposed as frauds, disaster is averted when Mao Zedong learns that Allan had saved his wife, Jiang Qing, during the Chinese Civil War. Allan and Herbert are given cash and sent to Bali for a long holiday.

In Bali, Herbert meets an Indonesian waitress, Ni Wayan Laksmi, whom he marries and renames Amanda. She corruptly makes use of the cash for her own political ends, and arranges to get herself appointed as Indonesia's ambassador to France.

In 1968, Amanda, Herbert and Allan travel to France. At the Élysée Palace Amanda and Allan have lunch with Charles de Gaulle and Lyndon B. Johnson who is in Paris for talks on the Vietnam War. Allan identifies the French Interior Minister Christian Fouchet's special advisor as a Soviet spy. This humiliates de Gaulle, but pleases Johnson who later makes Allan a CIA spy. Thanks to Allan's tip-off, the protests in Paris end. Allan is to be awarded a medal, but has already left for Moscow.

In Moscow, Allan is given cover in the American embassy, and is reunited with Popov. The pair decide to write intelligence reports which will please both sides. Their reports result in Richard Nixon visiting Leonid Brezhnev, but also causes both sides to increase spending on their nuclear deterrents. As the Soviet Union starts to collapse, Allan decides to return to Sweden.

Allan settles down to a peaceful life and adopts a cat that he names Molotov. Unfortunately, after Molotov is killed by a fox, Allan is unable to resist setting a trap with dynamite, resulting in a huge explosion. Eventually, the authorities decide to send Allan to the Malmköping retirement home. He rails at its strict rules, and decides to escape.

The book concludes with the 100-year-old Allan and his comrades flying to Indonesia, where they spend time at a luxury hotel managed by Amanda and her sons. When he is approached by a representative of the Indonesian government, who is interested in Allan's atomic bomb expertise, he agrees to help, telling himself that at least the Indonesian president, Yudhoyono, is sane - unlike the other leaders he has met in his lifetime.

Release and reception
The Hundred-Year-Old Man Who Climbed Out the Window and Disappeared was released as a hardback and audiobook in 2009, and as a paperback in 2010. It became the best selling book in Sweden in 2010, and by July 2012 had sold three million copies worldwide. The audiobook, read by the actor Björn Granath, won the Iris Ljudbokspris award in 2010. The book was published in the United Kingdom by Hesperus Press on 12 July 2012 and in the United States by Hyperion Books on 11 September 2012.

In 2013, it was adapted into a film of the same name.

On 23 August 2017, it was announced that CBS Films will collaborate with Gary Sanchez Productions in order to produce an American adaptation of the book. Will Ferrell will star in the film, and it will be produced by Ferrell along with Adam McKay and Jessica Elbaum. The screenplay will be written by Jason George.

References

2009 Swedish novels
Novels set in Sweden
Novels set in the 20th century
Swedish novels adapted into films
Swedish-language novels
Works about old age
Swedish comedy novels
Cultural depictions of Joseph Stalin
Cultural depictions of Francisco Franco
Works about Falangism
Cultural depictions of Kim Jong-il
Cultural depictions of Mao Zedong
Cultural depictions of Harry S. Truman
2009 debut novels